The Commander-in-Chief, Coast of Ireland was both an admiral's post and a naval formation of the Royal Navy. It was based at Queenstown, now Cobh, in Ireland from 1793 to 1919. The admiral's headquarters was at Admiralty House, Cobh.

History

The French Revolutionary Wars led to Cobh, then usually known as Ballyvoloon or The Cove of Cork, being developed as a British naval port, and assigned an admiral. The first appointment of an "Admiral Commanding in Ireland" or "Commander-in-Chief, Cork" was in 1793. The post remained unfilled between 1831 and 1843. It was renamed "Commander-in-Chief, Queenstown" in 1849 following a visit by Queen Victoria during which she renamed the town of Cobh "Queenstown".

The post became "Senior Officer on the Coast of Ireland" in 1876. The full title of the incumbent following the establishment of the post of Admiral Commanding, Coastguard and Reserves in 1903 was Senior Officer on the Coast of Ireland and Deputy to the Admiral Commanding Coastguard and Reserves for Coastguard Duty in Ireland.

In July 1915, not without misgivings in some quarters, Vice-Admiral Lewis Bayly was appointed to the post. Bayly was tasked with keeping the approaches to Britain safe from U-boat attacks. In 1917, Bayly, promoted to admiral and given the title Commander-in-Chief, Coast of Ireland, was given command of a mixed British-American force defending the Western Approaches. He took as his chief-of-staff the American captain Joel R. P. Pringle. Bayly had a good working relation with his U.S. counterpart William Sims. He held this post until 1919.

The post became "Commander in Chief, Western Approaches" in 1919, and was disestablished at the end of the Irish War of Independence in 1922. That year the town reverted to the name Cobh. The Royal Navy continued to station ships in Ireland, in accordance with the Anglo-Irish Treaty until 1938. After Ireland's independence, the Royal Navy presence generally consisted of two destroyers, with one usually anchored in the Cobh roadstead, opposite Haulbowline, and another either on roving patrol, or moored at Berehaven. These 'guard ships' were withdrawn and the harbour forts (probably including Fort Westmoreland, Fort Carlisle, and Fort Camden (Crosshaven) were handed over to the Irish Government in 1938.

Commanders
Commanders included:
  = died in post

Commander-in-Chief, Cork
Vice-Admiral Phillips Cosby (1790–1793)
Vice-Admiral Robert Kingsmill (1793-1800)
Vice-Admiral Lord Gardner (1800-1802)
Commodore William Domett (1802–1803)
Vice-Admiral Lord Gardner (1803–1805)
Rear-Admiral William O'Bryen Drury (1805–1807)
Vice-Admiral James Hawkins-Whitshed (1807-1810)
Vice-Admiral Edward Thornbrough (1810-1813)
Vice-Admiral Herbert Sawyer (1813-1815)
Rear-Admiral Benjamin Hallowell (1816-1818)
Rear-Admiral Josias Rowley (1818-1821)
Rear-Admiral Lord Colville (1821-1825)
Vice-Admiral Robert Plampin (1825-1828)

Commander-in-Chief on the coast of Ireland 
Rear-Admiral Charles Paget (March 1828 – 1831)
Commodore Sir Edward Troubridge (1831–1832)

Commander-in-Chief, Cobh
Rear-Admiral Hugh Pigot (1844-1847)
Rear-Admiral Thomas Ussher (1847-1848)

Commander-in-Chief, Queenstown
Rear-Admiral Donald Mackay (1848-1850) 
Rear-Admiral Manley Dixon (1850-1852)
Rear-Admiral John Purvis (1852-1855)
Rear-Admiral George Sartorius (1855-1856)
Rear-Admiral Henry Chads (1856-1858)
Rear-Admiral Charles Talbot (1858-1862)
Rear-Admiral Sir Lewis Jones (1862-1865)
Vice-Admiral Charles Frederick (1865-1867)
Rear-Admiral Claude Buckle (1867-1868)
Rear-Admiral Frederick Warden (1868-1869) 
Rear-Admiral Arthur Forbes (1869-1871)
Rear-Admiral Edmund Heathcote (1871-1874)
Rear-Admiral Robert Coote (1874-1876)

Senior Officer on the Coast of Ireland
Rear-Admiral Henry Hillyar (1876-1878)
Vice-Admiral William Dowell (1878-1880)
Rear-Admiral Richard Hamilton (1880-1883) 
Rear-Admiral Thomas Lethbridge (1883-1885)
Rear-Admiral Henry Hickley (1885-1886)
Rear-Admiral Walter Carpenter (1887-1888)
Rear-Admiral James Erskine (1888-1892)
Rear-Admiral Henry St John (1892-1895)
Rear-Admiral Claude Buckle (1895-1898)
Rear-Admiral Atwell Lake (1898-1901)
Vice-Admiral Edmund Jeffreys (1901-1904)
Vice-Admiral Angus MacLeod (1904-1906)
Rear-Admiral Sir George King-Hall (1906-1908)
Rear-Admiral Sir Alfred Paget (1908-1911)
Vice-Admiral Sir Charles Coke (1911-1915)

Commander-in-Chief, Coast of Ireland 
Admiral Sir Lewis Bayly (1915-1919) (title changed from Senior Officer, Coast of Ireland, to Commander-in-Chief, Coast of Ireland on 4 June 1917)

Commander-in-Chief, Western Approaches
Admiral Sir Reginald Tupper (1919-1921)
Admiral Sir Ernest Gaunt (1921-1922)

References

Commanders-in-chief of the Royal Navy
Military units and formations established in 1797
Military units and formations disestablished in 1922
Military units and formations of the Royal Navy in World War I
1797 establishments in the British Empire